Lieutenant General Faruk Yahaya   (born 5 January 1966) is a Nigerian army lieutenant general, who is the Chief of Army Staff of Nigeria, appointed by President Muhammadu Buhari on 27 May 2021 after the death of the former Chief of Army Staff, Ibrahim Attahiru who died in the Beechcraft King Air 350i plane crash near Kaduna International Airport.

Early life 
Faruk Yahaya was born on 5 January 1966 in Sifawa, Bodinga Local Government Area of Sokoto State. He is a graduate of the Nigerian Defence Academy, Armed Forces Command and Staff College, and Nigerian Army School of Infantry. He commenced officer cadet training on 27 September 1985 and was commissioned into the Nigerian Army Corps of Infantry as a Second Lieutenant on 27 December 1990.  He holds a master's degree in International Affairs and Diplomacy.

Military career 
Lt Gen Faruk Yahaya has attended all the relevant courses commensurate to his career which include, Young Officers Course, Infantry, Company Commanders Course, Infantry and Commanding Officers Course. He also attended Junior Staff
Course, Senior Staff Course and National Defence College amongst other, as well as several workshops and Seminars.

He has also held several appointments including Command, Staff and Instructional. Notable amongst them are Guards Brigade Garrison Commander, Directing Staff at the Armed Forces Command and Staff College (AFCSC), Deputy Director Army Headquarters Department of Military Secretary, Deputy Director Army Research and Development and Chief of Staff, Headquarters Joint Task Force Operation PULO SHIELD.

The Chief of Army Staff (COAS) has served as the Principal General Staff Officer (PGSO) to Honourable Minister of Defence, Commander, 4 Brigade and 29 Task Force Brigade (Operation ZAMAN LAFIYA). He was also Director Manpower at the Army Headquarter, Military Secretary Army Headquarters and General Officer Commanding (GOC) 1 Division of the Nigerian Army

Until his appointment as the COAS, Lt Gen Faruk Yahaya was the Theatre Commander Operation HADIN KAI, responsible for Counter Terrorism and Counter Insurgency operations in North East Nigeria.

Awards and honours 
Faruk Yahaya holds several honours and awards, some of which include, Nigerian Army Medal, Grand Service Star, Passed staff course Dagger, National Defence College (Chile), Field Command Medal of Honour, General Staff Medal of Honour and several other numerous medals, honours and awards. He is happily married and blessed with children.

Personal life
Yahaya is married and has four children.

References 

1966 births
Chiefs of Army Staff (Nigeria)
Nigerian Army officers
Nigerian Defence Academy alumni
Living people
People from Sokoto State